Gaylussacia bigeloviana, also known as the Northern Dwarf Huckleberry (English) or the  Gaylussaquier de Bigelow (French), is a plant species native to the coastal plains of eastern Canada and the eastern United States. It grows from Newfoundland to South Carolina in swamps and marshes, including acidic bogs alongside Sphagnum peatmosses.

Description
Gaylussacia bigeloviana is a shrub up to 1 m (40 inches) tall, sometimes forming small colonies. It has thick, leathery leaves, shiny on the top side, pale green on the underside. Flowers are in groups of 3–7, white, pink, or red. Fruits are black, juicy but bland-tasting.

Conservation
According to NatureServe, the species' conservation status is currently G4G5 (rounded G4) however it has not been reviewed since 1994.  More recently updated State/Provincial Statuses demonstrate wide variances with Nova Scotia (S5); New Brunswick, and Massachusetts (S4) reporting secure status while Newfoundland (S3S4); Prince Edward Island, Quebec, Connecticut, New Hampshire, North Carolina, Rhode Island (S2); New York (S1S2); South Carolina (S1) and Delaware (SH) all reporting at-risk status.

References

bigeloviana
Flora of Eastern Canada
Flora of the Northeastern United States
Flora of the Southeastern United States
Berries
Plants described in 1911